Wahi Pandhi (Sindhi: واهي پانڌي, Urdu: واہی پاندھی) is a town near Johi, Dadu District of Sindh, Pakistan. A road from Wahi Pandhi leads to Gorakh Hill. There is an archaeological mound, locally famous as 'Kotero Daro' was explored by N. G. Majumdar during his explorations in Sindh from 1926 to 1929. The pottery of Amri and Harappan phase was explored at the mound.

Gallery

References

Populated places in Dadu District